J. Prakash Kumar is an Independent politician from India. He was elected as a member of the Puducherry Legislative Assembly from Muthialpet (constituency). He defeated Vaiyapuri Manikandan of All India Anna Dravida Munnetra Kazhagam by 934 votes in 2021 Puducherry Assembly election.

He was represented in the National Democratic Alliance (NDA) led by the All India NR Congress has won the majority.

References 

Living people
Year of birth missing (living people)
21st-century Indian politicians
People from Puducherry
Independent politicians in India
Puducherry MLAs 2021–2026
All India NR Congress politicians